Lawns are aesthetically maintained grassy areas.

Lawns or The Lawns may also refer to:

 Lawns, West Yorkshire, Wakefield, England
 The Lawns, Hull, Yorkshire, England
 The Lawns Estate, Swindon, England

See also
 Lawns Park, Havering, London, England
 
 Lawn (disambiguation)